Randy "rk" Post is an illustrator of fantasy publications.

Background
Post was raised in  Illinois on a farm.

Post has done freelance work for TSR, including Red Steel, Cutthroats of Lankhmar, and Spells & Magic. Post garnered a full-time staff illustration position at TSR in September 1996, painting cover illustrations for games and novels. Post soon began working on two projects: the Planescape setting for the Dungeons & Dragons game, and the new Alternity science fiction role-playing game. Post has worked on games and game lines such as Planescape, Deadlands, Alternity, Star Wars, and Vampire.

Career
TSR was purchased by Wizards of the Coast soon after Post was hired. Post had the opportunity to illustrate cards for Magic: the Gathering, and also painted covers for Dungeon magazine. WotC and Post parted  for ways in the winter of 2000 and he now doubles as a full-time freelance illustrator still contracting occasional assignments through the subsidiary of Hasbro, Inc., and as a 2D and 3D artist for Gas Powered Games. Most recently, he finished working full-time as a 3D environmental artist for Sony Online Entertainment in May 2008.

Post was nominated for an ASFA Chesley Award, for Best Gaming-Related Illustration, in 1999 for his work Alternity: Player's Handbook (cover), and again in 2002 for his work "Lightning Angel (card art for Magic: Apocalypse Expansion)".

Works
Randy Post has contracted and work through White Wolf, WizKids, Fanpro, Palladium Books (Palladium Fantasy, Nightbane, Rifts), Microsoft (Mythica, Xbox), LucasFilm, 20th Century Fox (Alien vs Predator), Sega (Dreamcast), Nintendo, Ballantine Books, Science Fiction Book Club, Hasbro (television and animation), Marvel Entertainment, DC Comics, Dark Horse Comics, the History Channel, and Blizzard Ent (Diablo 2, World of Warcraft). rk post has his collected works available in a hard cover art book, "Postmortem: "The Art of rk post" by Cartouche Press.

References

External links
 Postmortem- The Art of rk post
 
 RK Post New Works
 Cartouche Press

American illustrators
American speculative fiction artists
Fantasy artists
Game artists
Living people
Role-playing game artists
Science fiction artists
Year of birth missing (living people)